In mathematics, Poinsot's spirals are two spirals represented by the polar equations

where csch is the hyperbolic cosecant, and sech is the hyperbolic secant. They are named after the French mathematician Louis Poinsot.

Examples of the two types of Poinsot's spirals

See also
Cotes's spiral

References

Spirals